Walter Stith (born January 2, 1983 in Atlanta, Georgia) is an American football offensive tackle who played for the Buffalo Bills of the National Football League. He was originally signed by the Cleveland Browns as an undrafted free agent in 2005. He played collegiately at North Carolina A&T.  Stith signed as a free agent with the BC Lions of the Canadian Football League in May 2008.  He was released in July 2009.

External links
Buffalo Bills Bio
North Carolina A&T Aggies Bio
BC Lions Bio

1983 births
Living people
American football offensive tackles
Players of American football from Atlanta
Cleveland Browns players
Buffalo Bills players
North Carolina A&T Aggies football players